Manek Urai is a small town in Kuala Krai District, Kelantan, Malaysia.

See also
Manek Urai by-election, 2009

References

Kuala Krai District
Towns in Kelantan